Alexandra Aerodrome  is an aerodrome 2 NM (3.7 km) northwest of Alexandra, New Zealand.

History 

The aerodrome saw South Pacific Airlines of New Zealand (SPANZ) operate Douglas DC-3 services from December 1960 to February 1966; then Mount Cook Airlines used Britten-Norman Islanders from 1969 to 1991, connecting to Dunedin and Queenstown. Goldfields Air flew during 1985–86 to Christchurch. Pacifica Air flew into Alexandra during 1988–89; and Airlink during 1989.

In 2007-2008 Mainland Air trialled scheduled services from Dunedin to Alexandra and Queenstown, but due to lack of patronage these did not continue. Mainland Aviation College, a division of Mainland Air, set up a flight training college in late 2009 which no longer operates in Alexandra The Central Otago Flying Club now operates a sole Cessna 172 as a training aircraft from Alexandra.

Operational Information 
Circuit
Powered aircraft
01/19, 32 Left hand
14 Right hand
Gliders and tugs
14 Left hand
32 Right hand
FAL 
Mobil Aerostop, Jet A1, Avgas100
BP Jet A1
RFS CAT1 located in terminal area

See also

 List of airports in New Zealand
 List of airlines of New Zealand
 Transport in New Zealand

Sources 
NZAIP Volume 4 AD
Alexandra Aerodrome at Airports Worldwide
Central Otago Flying Club

Airports in New Zealand
Transport in Otago
Buildings and structures in Otago
Alexandra, New Zealand
Transport buildings and structures in Otago